The Universidad Columbia del Paraguay (Columbia University of Paraguay) is a private university. It was founded in 1943, but it obtained the title of university only in 1991. In 60 years it had more than 200,000 students.

Degrees
These are the careers that UCP has: 
 Agricultural Management 
 Business Administration 
 Architecture
 Film Industry 
 Foreign Trade
 Marketing
 Social Engineering
 Fine arts
 Hotel and Tourism
 Computer engineering
 Accounting
 Law
 Veterinary
 Psychology
 Education
 Commercial engineering

Campuses
Asunción-25 de Mayo
Asunción-España
San Lorenzo
Pedro Juan Caballero

External links
Official site (Spanish)

Universities in Paraguay
Educational institutions established in 1943
1943 establishments in Paraguay